The ten provinces of Zambia are divided into a total of 116 districts as of 2018.

Article 109 in part VIII of the constitution of Zambia deals with local government. It states only that there should be some form of local government, and that this local government should be based on democratically elected councils on the basis of universal adult suffrage.

Provincial Districts in Zambia

Until 2011, Zambia was subdivided into 72 districts. However, since 2011, a number of new districts have been created, bringing the total to 116 as of 2018.

Total Districts by Province
 Central Province (11 districts)
 Copperbelt Province (10 districts)
 Eastern Province (15 districts)
 Luapula Province (12 districts)
 Lusaka Province (6 districts)
 Muchinga Province (8 districts)
 Northern Province (12 districts)
 North-Western Province (11 districts)
 Southern Province (15 districts)
 Western Province (16 districts)

Central Province

Central Province is composed of 11 districts

Copperbelt Province

Copperbelt Province is composed of 10 districts
 Chililabombwe District
 Chingola District
 Kalulushi District
 Kitwe District
 Luanshya District
 Lufwanyama District
 Masaiti District
 Mpongwe District
 Mufulira District
 Ndola District

Eastern Province

Eastern Province is composed of 15 districts.
 Chadiza District
 Chama District
 Chasefu District
 Chipangali District
 Chipata District
 Kasenengwa District
 Katete District
 Lumezi District
 Lundazi District
 Lusangazi District
 Mambwe District
 Nyimba District
 Petauke District
 Sinda District
 Vubwi District

Luapula Province

Luapula Province is composed of 12 districts.
 Chembe District
 Chiengi District
 Chifunabuli District
 Chipili District
 Kawambwa District
 Lunga District
 Mansa District
 Milenge District
 Mwansabombwe District
 Mwense District
 Nchelenge District
 Samfya District

Lusaka Province

Lusaka Province is composed of 6 districts.
 Chilanga District
 Chongwe District
 Kafue District
 Luangwa District
 Lusaka District
 Rufunsa District

Muchinga Province

Muchinga Province is composed of 8 Districts, with consideration of gazetting Chilinda area in Chinsali as the 9th district.
 Chinsali District
 Isoka District
 Kanchibiya District
 Lavushimanda District
 Mafinga District
 Mpika District
 Nakonde District
 Shiwang'andu District

Northern Province

Northern Province is composed of 12 districts.
 Chilubi District
 Kaputa District
 Kasama District
 Lunte District
 Lupososhi District
 Luwingu District
 Mbala District
 Mporokoso District
 Mpulungu District
 Mungwi District
 Nsama District
 Senga District

North-Western Province

North-Western Province is composed of 11 districts.
 Chavuma District
 Ikelenge District
 Kabompo District
 Kasempa District
 Kalumbila District
 Manyinga District
 Mufumbwe District
 Mushindamo District
 Mwinilunga District
 Solwezi District
 Zambezi District

Southern Province

Southern Province is composed of 15 districts. The provincial capital was moved from Livingstone to Choma in 2012, with Livingstone retaining the status of national tourist capital.
 Chikankata District
 Chirundu District
 Choma District
 Gwembe District
 Itezhi-Tezhi District
 Kalomo District
 Kazungula District
 Livingstone District
 Mazabuka District
 Monze District
 Namwala District
 Pemba District
 Siavonga District
 Sinazongwe District
 Zimba District

Western Province

Western Province is composed of 16 districts.
 Kalabo District
 Kaoma District
 Limulunga District
 Luampa District
 Lukulu District
 Mitete District
 Mongu District
 Mulobezi District
 Mwandi District
 Nalolo District
 Nkeyema District
 Senanga District
 Sesheke District
 Shang'ombo District
 Sikongo District
 Sioma District

See also
Provinces of Zambia

References 

 Ministry of Local Government and Housing - Local Authorities

External links 
Zambia Desktop Mapping Tools for Microsoft Office  by Andy Lyons.

 
Subdivisions of Zambia
Zambia, Districts
Zambia 2
Districts, Zambia
Districts
Local government in Zambia